Through the Valley of the Nest of Spiders is a novel by Samuel R. Delany.

Publishing history
An excerpt from a draft of the novel was published as "In the Valley of the Nest of Spiders" in issue 7 of Black Clock magazine.

A set of typographical corrections for the published novel has already been released.

Plot summary
The novel begins in Atlanta, Georgia, on July 6, 2007, where we meet Eric Jeffers some six days before his seventeenth birthday. Eric is living with his adoptive father, Mike. The story follows Eric as he goes to live with his mother, Barbara, in the fictive "Runcible County" on the Georgia coast. There, living in the town of "Diamond Harbor", Eric learns that a black, gay philanthropist has established a utopian community for black gay men in a neighborhood called the Dump. Eric takes a job with the local garbage man, Dynamite Haskel, and his nineteen-year-old son and helper, Morgan Haskel. Eric and Morgan become life partners, and the novel follows them—through job changes (from garbage men, to managing a pornographic theater, to handymen), changes of friends, and changes of address (from a cabin in the Dump, to an apartment over the movie theater, to another cabin out on Gilead, a nearby island)—into the twilight of their years. Though it does move many decades into the future and off-handedly mentions fictional future events and technologies, much of the novel does not feel like far future science fiction. It ends somewhere between 2070 and '80.

Themes

The title of the novel suggests Italo Calvino's similarly titled novel The Path to the Nest of Spiders.

Through the Valley of the Nest of Spiders can also be viewed as a companion piece to Dark Reflections, Delany's immediately previous novel. But where Dark Reflections centers on themes of loneliness, sexual repression, fear, and the difficult life of the artist, Through the Valley of the Nest of Spiders, in sharp contrast, celebrates companionship, love, sexual openness, and freedom. Toward the end of Dark Reflections, we learn that in his youth, Arnold Hawley, the novel's protagonist, ran away in fear from a situation that would likely have changed the course of his life. Early in Through the Valley of the Nest of Spiders, Eric is told a story by Bill Bottom, a neighbor of his. Bill, like Arnold, ran away from a situation that had the potential for great happiness. He concludes by asking Eric to promise that when he is presented with his own choice—and, Bill insists, that moment will come—to choose happiness, no matter how afraid he might be to take that path. The major themes of Through the Valley of the Nest of Spiders are love, relationships, and the consequences—both good and bad—of taking that chance and making the choice to go after what makes you happy.

Beginning relatively early in Eric's life (while he is still seventeen in the story), he repeatedly expresses a desire to do good things for other people. This is a thematic element that spans the novel.

There is also a very strong tie to Baruch Spinoza. He is mentioned early in the novel, and in the latter half, Eric is given a copy of Ethica by a cross-dressing one-time theology student, Mama Grace. Eric agrees to read Ethica three times. It shapes and reflects his actions and attitudes.

Like The Mad Man, Hogg, and Equinox, Through the Valley of the Nest of Spiders has number of highly sexually explicit scenes, of many sorts.

In recent interviews, Delany has stated that it is his design to have Through the Valley of the Nest of Spiders straddle the genera realism, science fiction, and pornography.

Delany has said, in an interview with Kenneth James, that he was inspired to write the book by a quote from Vladimir Nabokov. In the essay "On A Book Entitled 'Lolita'", Nabokov describes what he learned when he deduced that his novel had been rejected by publishers who, dismayed by its theme of underage sexuality and rape, didn't even read it. He stated:

Literary significance and criticism
Through the Valley of the Nest of Spiders garnered positive reviews. Roger Bellin of the Los Angeles Review of Books called it "a book worthy of his career full of masterpieces — and a book that no one else could have written." Steven Shaviro stated that "it is the best English-language novel that I know of, of the 21st century so far." Further praise came in reviews from Paul Di Filippo in a review in Locus magazine and a brief review and long discussion led by Jo Walton at Tor.com.

Edward Parker of Lambda Literary stated that "Time is an important theme throughout the book. Delany has constructed the story so that time passes slowly in the beginning—the whole first half of the book covers only five of the novel’s seventy years—and then accelerates as the main characters age, structurally reflecting the human experience of time...but I wondered occasionally, especially in the novel’s first half, whether the story could not have been told in fewer words." Parker criticized what he saw as a lack of editorial oversight, citing as an example a passage describing toastmaking that had little to do with the scene occurring around it but also considering the literary worth of its prose and wondering if it helped the reader relate to "the feeling of the slowness of time."

External links
 Reading at St Marks Bookshop, NYC April 23, 2012.

References

2012 American novels
2012 LGBT-related literary works
Novels by Samuel Delany
2012 science fiction novels
2012 fantasy novels
Utopian novels
Novels with gay themes
Novels set in Atlanta
2010s LGBT novels
American LGBT novels
LGBT speculative fiction novels